Drosato (Greek: Δροσάτο) may refer to several places in Greece:

Drosato, Corfu, a village in the island of Corfu 
Drosato, Karditsa, a village in the Karditsa regional unit
Drosato, Achaea, a village in Achaea 
Drosato, Kilkis, a village in the Kilkis regional unit
Drosato, Phocis, a village in Phocis